Kielan is a surname. Notable people with the surname include:

Abd al Haqq Kielan (born 1941), Swedish Muslim cleric
Urszula Kielan (born 1960), Polish high jumper
Zofia Kielan-Jaworowska (1925–2015), Polish paleobiologist

Polish-language surnames